Ek Thi Rani Aisi Bhi is a 2017 Hindi language biopic directed by Gul Bahar Singh starring Hema Malini, who portrays Vijaya Raje Scindia. The film is based on Mridula Sinha's biography novel Rajpath se Lokhpath par, and traces her journey from Palace to the public. Vinod Khanna portrayed as Jivajirao Scindia of Gwalior. The film was completed and released in theatres on 21 April 2017, and premiered to television on Zee Classic on 6 May 2017. The film was shown in 49th International film festival of India in Goa.

Plot
Ek Thi Rani Aisi Bhi is a story of conflict between righteousness and autocracy, between modesty and pride, between idealism and opportunism. It is the saga of king who loved his people and died of a broken heart when separated from them. It is the legend of queen who never compromised with her faith and became the mother of millions of propagating love. The merger of the princely states with the Indian Union after Independence had left several kings and queens disheartened. Especially when those monarchs who considered their subjects as their own children and whose objective was to improve the lot of the people. It was a difficult situation to cope with.

Maharaja Jivajirao Scindia of Gwalior was one of those unfortunate monarchs. He died prematurely leaving his wife, Vijaya Raje Scindia at the mercy of a political party. She struggled hard but in the process lost her son in the war of ideology. She was never reconciled to the fact that her son would join hands with those who brought hardship to the people. It was the beginning of the end of a relationship between mother and her son. It was difficult situation for the mother. But she had never bowed down to those forces and went her own way. It was a road that finally led to the triumph of truth, faith and human values.

Cast 
 Hema Malini as Vijaya Raje Scindia
 Vinod Khanna as Jivaji Rao Scindia
 Sachin Khedekar as ADC
 Rajesh Shringarpore as Madhorao Scindia
 Priyanshi Mane as Vijaya's Daughter

References

External links

2017 films
Indian biographical films
2010s Hindi-language films
Films based on Indian novels
2010s biographical films